Ne'er-Do-Well is a 1954 detective novel by the English author Dornford Yates (Cecil William Mercer), his only work of the genre. Although Richard Chandos narrates, the book is not generally classified as a 'Chandos' title.

Plot 
Superintendent Falcon investigates the murder of Lord St Amont at the village of Ne'er-do-Well. Much of the story is set in a convent.

Critical reception 
Mercer’s biographer AJ Smithers considered the novel to bear the marks of being written by an elderly and not over-robust man, being short on action and concentrating rather on states of mind. It was not a commercial success.

References

Bibliography
 

1954 British novels
Ward, Lock & Co. books
Novels by Dornford Yates

British detective novels